The CHAMPS Project (Creating High Achievements in Mathematics, Problem-solving, and Science) is a combined effort of the Mississippi School for Mathematics and Science and the Mississippi University for Women aimed at improving various aspects of education in Mississippi. The goal of the CHAMPS Project is to improve student achievement and teacher quality in mathematics through a sustained program of professional development for K-8th grade teachers based on College and Career Readiness mathematics content, teaching strategies, and utilizing formative assessment to inform and guide instruction.

References

External links
 MSMS CHAMPS Project
 MSMS homepage

Education in Mississippi